Pavel Vyhnal (born 25 May 1990) is a retired Czech footballer.

External links
 
 
 

Czech footballers
Czech First League players
SK Slavia Prague players
Bohemians 1905 players
FK Teplice players
FC Fastav Zlín players
1990 births
Living people
Association football forwards
Footballers from Prague